John Cooper Jr. (September 15, 1922 – May 3, 2011) was an American actor and director. Known as Jackie Cooper, he began his career performing in film as a child, and successfully transitioned to adult roles and directing in both film and television. At age nine, he became the only child nominated for the Academy Award for Best Actor – and remains one of the youngest performers ever nominated for any Oscar – for the 1931 film Skippy. He was a featured member of the Our Gang ensemble in 1929–1931, 1955-58 The People's Choice, the title character in the 1959–1962 TV series Hennesey, and Perry White in the 1978–1987 Superman films.

Early life
John Cooper Jr. was born in Los Angeles, California. Cooper's father, John Cooper, left the family when Jackie was two years old. His mother, Mabel Leonard Bigelow (née Polito), was a stage pianist. Cooper's maternal uncle, Jack Leonard, was a screenwriter and his maternal aunt, Julie Leonard, was an actress married to director Norman Taurog. Cooper's stepfather was C.J. Bigelow, a studio production manager. His mother was Italian American (her family's surname was changed from "Polito" to "Leonard"); Cooper was told by his family that his father was Jewish. The two never reunited after he had left the family.

Early acting career

Cooper first appeared in films as an extra with his grandmother, who took him to her auditions hoping it would help her get extra work. At age three, Jackie appeared in Lloyd Hamilton comedies under the name of "Leonard".

Cooper graduated to bit parts in feature films such as Fox Movietone Follies of 1929 and Sunny Side Up. His director in those films, David Butler, recommended Cooper to director Leo McCarey, who arranged an audition for the Our Gang comedy series produced by Hal Roach. In 1929, Cooper signed a three-year contract after joining the series in the short Boxing Gloves. He initially was to be a supporting character in the series, but by early 1930 his success in transitioning to sound films enabled him to become one of Our Gang's major characters. He was the main character in the 1930 entries The First Seven Years and When the Wind Blows. His most notable performances explore his crush on schoolteacher Miss Crabtree, (portrayed by June Marlowe) in the trilogy Teacher's Pet, School's Out, and Love Business.

While under contract to Hal Roach Studios, in 1931 Cooper was loaned to Paramount to star in Skippy, directed by his uncle, Norman Taurog. At age nine, Cooper was nominated for an Academy Award for Best Actor, the youngest actor to be nominated for an Oscar in that category. Although Paramount paid Roach $25,000 for Cooper's services, Roach paid Cooper a standard salary of $50 per week.

Cooper was in great demand, resulting in Roach selling the actor's contract to Metro-Goldwyn-Mayer in 1931. Cooper acted with Wallace Beery in The Champ (1931—Beery's Oscar-winning role); a wittily comedic romp titled The Bowery (1933) with George Raft, Fay Wray and Pert Kelton; Robert Louis Stevenson's Treasure Island (1934) with Lionel Barrymore, Lewis Stone and Nigel Bruce; and a father-son circus story about a one-armed animal trainer titled O'Shaughnessy's Boy (1935). In his autobiography, Cooper wrote that Beery was a disappointment and accused Beery of upstaging him and attempting to undermine his performances out of jealousy.

Cooper played the lead role in the first two Henry Aldrich films, What a Life (1939) and Life with Henry (1941).

Adult years

Cooper served in the U.S. Navy during World War II, remaining in the reserves until 1982, retiring at the rank of captain and receiving the Legion of Merit. He starred in two television sitcoms, NBC's The People's Choice with Patricia Breslin and CBS's Hennesey with Abby Dalton. In 1954, he guest-starred on the NBC legal drama Justice. He appeared on ABC's The Pat Boone Chevy Showroom, guest-starred with Tennessee Ernie Ford on NBC's The Ford Show as America's Uranium King, and as Charles A. Steen in "I Found 60 Million Dollars" on the Armstrong Circle Theatre.

In 1950, Cooper was cast in a production of Mr. Roberts in Boston, Massachusetts in the role of Ensign Pulver. From 1964 to 1969, Cooper was vice president of program development at Columbia Pictures Screen Gems TV division. He was responsible for packaging series such as Bewitched and selling them to the networks. In 1964, Cooper appeared in Rod Serling's The Twilight Zone episode "Caesar and Me", and in 1968 a made-for-television film Shadow on the Land.

Cooper left Columbia in 1969. He appeared in the fourth season of Hawaii Five-O in an episode called The Burning Ice. Cooper appeared in Candidate for Crime starring Peter Falk as Columbo in 1973, and in the 1975 ABC series Mobile One, a Jack Webb/Mark VII Limited production. He guest-starred in a 1978 two-part episode of The Rockford Files: The House on Willis Avenue. Cooper's work as director on episodes of M*A*S*H and The White Shadow earned him Emmy awards.

In the 1970s and 1980s, Cooper appeared as Daily Planet editor Perry White in the Superman film series, a role he got after Keenan Wynn, who was originally cast as White, became unavailable after suffering a heart attack.

Cooper's final film role was as Ace Morgan in the 1987 film Surrender, starring Sally Field, Michael Caine, and Steve Guttenberg.

Personal life

Cooper served in the United States Navy during World War II and remained active in the Naval Reserve for the next several decades, reaching the rank of captain. He was married to June Horne from 1944 until 1949, with whom he had a son, John "Jack" Cooper, III, who was born in 1946. June was the daughter of director James W. Horne and actress Cleo Ridgely. Cooper was married to Hildy Parks from 1950 until 1951, and to Barbara Rae Kraus from 1954 until her death in 2009. Cooper and Kraus had three children, Russell, born in 1956, Julie, born in 1957, and Cristina, born in 1959. Julie and Cristina died in 1997 and 2009, respectively.

Cooper participated in several automobile racing events, including the record-breaking class D cars at the Bonneville Salt Flats in Utah. He drove in several SCCA road racing competitions. Cooper was named the honorary starter for the 1976 Winston 500 at the Alabama International Motor Speedway, which is now known as Talladega Superspeedway, in Talladega, Alabama.

Cooper's autobiography, Please Don't Shoot My Dog, was published in 1982. The title refers to an incident during the filming of Skippy, when Norman Taurog, who was the director, needed Cooper to cry a number of times on camera. To accomplish that, Taurog used various tricks intended to upset Cooper. For example, one time Taurog ordered a security guard to go backstage and pretend to shoot Cooper's dog. The stunt resulted in genuine tears; Cooper afterwards discovered his dog was in fact fine. Later that same day, his mother came to the set, and showed Cooper a better way for an actor to experience emotions in the scene–by studying the script, and empathizing with the character he was portraying.

Cooper announced his retirement in 1989, although he continued directing episodes of the syndicated series Superboy. He began spending more time training and racing horses at Hollywood Park and outside San Diego during the Del Mar racing season. Cooper lived in Beverly Hills from 1955 until his death.

For his contributions to the motion picture industry, Cooper was honored with a Hollywood Walk of Fame star located at 1507 Vine Street.

Death
Cooper died on May 3, 2011, of natural causes, in Santa Monica, California. He was survived by his two sons. He outlived both his daughters and wife, Barbara Rae Kraus. He was interred at Arlington National Cemetery in Arlington, Virginia, in honor of his naval service.

Filmography

See also
 List of oldest and youngest Academy Award winners and nominees – Youngest nominees for Best Actor in a Leading Role

References

Further reading
 Wise, James. Stars in Blue: Movie Actors in America's Sea Services. Annapolis, MD: Naval Institute Press, 1997;  
 Holmstrom, John. The Moving Picture Boy: An International Encyclopaedia from 1895 to 1995, Norwich, Michael Russell, 1996, pp. 106–107.
 Dye, David. Child and Youth Actors: Filmography of Their Entire Careers, 1914-1985. Jefferson, NC: McFarland & Co., 1988, pp. 40–43.
 Maltin, Leonard (ed.), Hollywood Kids, New York: Popular Books, 1978. 
 Parish, James Robert. Great Child Stars, New York: Ace Books, 1976.
 Best, Marc. Those Endearing Young Charms: Child Performers of the Screen, South Brunswick and New York: Barnes & Co., 1971, pp. 40–44.
 Zierold, Norman J. The Child Stars, New York: Coward-McCann, 1965.
 Willson, Dixie. ''Little Hollywood Stars", Akron, OH, e New York: Saalfield Pub. Co., 1935.

External links

 
 
 ANC Explorer
 
 
 Photographs of Jackie Cooper

1922 births
2011 deaths
20th-century American male actors
Male actors from Los Angeles
American male child actors
American male film actors
American memoirists
United States Navy personnel of World War II
American male television actors
American television directors
Television producers from California
Beverly Hills High School alumni
Burials at Arlington National Cemetery
Recipients of the Legion of Merit
Hal Roach Studios actors
Metro-Goldwyn-Mayer contract players
Primetime Emmy Award winners
American male comedy actors
United States Navy captains
Military personnel from California
Our Gang
Film directors from Los Angeles
United States Navy reservists
American people of Italian descent